Mack Neal "Shooty" Babitt (born March 9, 1959) is an American former second baseman who played for the Oakland Athletics during the 1981 Major League Baseball (MLB) season. After retiring as a player, Babitt became a baseball scout, and later worked as a television analyst.

Career
Babitt was drafted by the Oakland Athletics in the 25th round of the  Major League Baseball Draft. He began his career with a seven-game hitting streak, the second longest such streak in Oakland A's history. For his career, Babitt played in 54 major league games in 1981, hitting .256 in 156 at bats. Oakland manager Billy Martin later commented, "If you ever see Shooty Babitt play second base for me again, I want you to Shooty me."

Babitt was a long-time advance scout for the Arizona Diamondbacks, and since 2008, he has been a scout for the New York Mets. Additionally, since 2008, he has worked as a television color analyst on the pre- and post-game shows for Oakland A's home games on NBC Sports California. Beginning in 2014, he has also substituted for game analyst Ray Fosse on 20 A's games per season. 

His son, Zach Babitt was selected by the Los Angeles Dodgers in the 10th round of the 2012 Major League Baseball Draft.

References

External links

1959 births
Living people
Arizona Diamondbacks scouts
Atlanta Braves scouts
New York Mets scouts
Oakland Athletics announcers
Oakland Athletics players
Medicine Hat A's players
Modesto A's players
Waterbury A's players
Ogden A's players
West Haven Whitecaps players
Tacoma Tigers players
Wichita Aeros players
Memphis Chicks players
Indianapolis Indians players
Major League Baseball second basemen
Baseball players from Oakland, California
Berkeley High School (Berkeley, California) alumni